Places for Breathing is the first studio album by American post-grunge band Revis. Released in May 2003 on Epic Records, it was recorded in 2002 at NRG Recording Studios in North Hollywood. The album features the singles "Caught in the Rain" and "Seven" and debuted at number one on Billboard's Heatseekers chart.

Writing and recording
All songs were written on acoustic guitar before being demoed. Guitarist Nathaniel Cox wrote all lyrics with some input by vocalist Justin Holman. "A Gift," "Seven," and "Straight Jacket Labels" served as the band's first three demos produced by Tommy Henriksen and Jeff Tilson. They then recorded "Caught in the Rain" and "Spin" to encourage further label hype prior to being signed. Upon their joining Epic Records, Revis worked with famed producer Don Gilmore as well as Andy Wallace and Alan Moulder on mixing. In New York, Wallace provided mixing on two tracks while Moulder covered the remainder of the album.

Session drummer Josh Freese provided drumming tracks with the exception of "Your Wall" which was recorded by new Revis drummer David Piribauer.

Touring and promotion
Revis toured with Oleander in early 2003 before headlining the second stage of Pearl Jam's tour. They also joined Creed as well as Cold and Evanescence on the first Nintendo Fusion Tour.

The first track, "Caught in the Rain," first appeared in the film Daredevil in February 2003 where it originally played as the last song in the closing credits, and was also included in its respective soundtrack album Daredevil: The Album. A music video was also produced with director Steven Murashige whose previous work included Incubus' "Pardon Me" and Rage Against the Machine's "Renegades of Funk." The song also appeared in the videogame MVP Baseball 2003.

"Seven" would serve as a follow-up single and managed to land on the Mainstream Rock chart.

Track listing
"Caught in the Rain" - 3:28
 "Your Wall" - 3:29
 "Spin"- 3:08
 "Seven" - 4:14
 "Straight Jacket Labels" - 3:40
 "Living Rooms" - 2:51
 "Re Use" - 3:52
 "City Beneath" - 3:32
 "Everything After" - 3:21
 "Places for Breathing" - 3:21
 "Look Right Through Me" - 06:15
 "Family" (hidden track)

Unreleased Tracks
 "From That Point On"  - 3:24
 "A Gift" - 4:15
 "Shotgun Star (Bright)" - 3:25
 "Butterfly Cry" - 3:25

Personnel
Band
Justin Holman – vocals
Robert Davis – guitar
Nathaniel Cox – guitar
Bob Thiemann – bass
David Piribauer – drums (on "Your Wall")
Other
Josh Freese - session drums (all tracks except "Your Wall")
Jason Taylor - DJ Turntables (Seven, Straight Jacket Labels, Look Right Through Me)
Don Gilmore - production
Andy Wallace - mixing (tracks 1 & 4)
Alan Moulder - mixing
Ted Jensen - mastering

Chart positions

Album

Singles

References

External links
"Caught in the Rain" music video

2003 debut albums
Revis albums
Epic Records albums